Distorted is a South Korean television series starring Namkoong Min, Uhm Ji-won, Yoo Jun-sang, Jeon Hye-bin and Moon Sung-keun. It aired on SBS, premiered from July 24 to September 12, 2017 on Mondays and Tuesdays at 22:00 (KST) time slot for 32 episodes.

Synopsis
A story about reporters who struggle to get to the bottom of the truth of social corruption.

Cast

Main
Namkoong Min as Han Moo-young
A troublemaker who witnesses his reporter brother die while trying to report on a big corruption scandal. He becomes a reporter himself for his brother's revenge.
Uhm Ji-won as Kwon So-ra
A prosecutor who graduated at the top of her class and became well known for becoming the youngest-ever female rookie.
 Yoo Jun-sang as Lee Seok-min
 A journalist, cynical, stubborn, and prickly person who's sceptic with a lot of injustice to vent.
 Jeon Hye-bin as Oh Yoo-kyung
 A reporter from the Splash Team who has a long working history together with Lee Seok-min.
 Moon Sung-keun as Koo Tae-won
 Director of Daehan Newspaper.

Supporting

Aeguk Newspaper
 Jo Hee-bong as Yang Dong-sik
 Kim Kang-hyun as Lee Yong-sik
 Park Kyung-hye as Seo Na-rae 
 Ahn Ji-hoon as Yang Sang-ho

Splash Team
 Park Sung-hoon as Na Sung-shik
 Oh Ah-yeon as Gong Ji-won

Prosecution
 Park Ji-young as Cha Yeon-soo
 Jung Hee-tae as Park Jin-woo
 Park Won-sang as Im Ji-tae

Extended

 Choi Gwi-hwa as Yang Choo-sung
 Kim Gi-nam as Lee Byung-kwan
 Ryu Seung-soo as Jo Young-gi
 Kim Min-sang as Jung Hae-dong
 Jung Man-sik as Jun Chan-soo
 Park Jung-hak as Park Eung-mo
 Lee Joo-seung as Yoon Seon-woo
 Bae Hae-sun as Choi Su-yeon
 Kim Hye-seong as Song Tae-joon
 Kang Shin-hyo as Moon Shin-nam
 Park Sang-Hui
 Ha Kyung-min
 Seo Bo-ik
 Seo Ho-chul
 Ji Sung-hwan
 Yoo Jae-hoon
 Kim Jong-ho
 Kim Kyung-min
 Jo Jung-moon
 Choi Young
 Kim Myung-sun
 Yoon Hee-won
 Choi Jae-young
 Kim Yoon-sang
 Yoon Seo-young
 Kang Deuk-jong

Special appearances
 Oh Jung-se as Han Chul-ho
 Han Moo-young's brother who died for whistleblowing an article on a big corruption scandal.
Kim Jong-soo
 Jo Young-jin
 Lee Sang-hong
 Cha Soon-bae as Kim Sun-hong
 Yoo Ha-bok
 Kim Hyung-mook
 Jung Ok
 Park Hoon as an Informant
 Joo Suk-tae as a Lawyer (Ep. 7)

Production
Filming began in early May without the female lead. First script reading with the entire cast took place in June and filming commenced straight after.

Reception
Despite premiering later than its competitors by one week, the series topped ratings for its time slot. It received attention for revealing cases that remind viewers of the infamous "Sung Wan-jong List," one of the biggest political corruption scandals during the former Park Geun-hye administration, and swimmer Park Tae-hwan's doping test scandal.

Original Soundtrack

Part 1

Ratings
 In the table below, the blue numbers represent the lowest ratings and the red numbers represent the highest ratings.

References

External links
  
 

Seoul Broadcasting System television dramas
South Korean legal television series
South Korean thriller television series
2017 South Korean television series debuts
2017 South Korean television series endings
Television series about journalism
Television series by Studio S